Ashbrow is a ward of Huddersfield in the metropolitan borough of Kirklees, West Yorkshire, England.   It contains 50 listed buildings that are recorded in the National Heritage List for England.  Of these, one is listed at Grade II*, the middle of the three grades, and the others are at Grade II, the lowest grade. The ward is to the north of the centre of Huddersfield, and includes the districts of Ashbrow, Brackenhall, Bradley, Deighton, Fixby, Netheroyd Hill, and Sheepridge.  The southern part of the ward is suburban and residential, and to the north is some parkland and countryside. The Huddersfield Broad Canal and the Kirklees Cut of the Calder and Hebble Navigation originate in the ward, and the River Calder passes through it; the listed buildings associated with these waterways include locks, bridges, a floodgate, a canal milestone, and a lock keeper's cottage.  The former country house, Fixby Hall, later a golf clubhouse, is in the northwest part of the ward; this is listed, together with associated structures and the lodges at the entrances to its park.  The other listed buildings include houses, cottages, and associated structures, farmhouses and farm buildings, another country house, churches and items in churchyards, the parapet of a ford, a road milestone, and two railway bridges.


Key

Buildings

References

Citations

Sources

Lists of listed buildings in West Yorkshire
Buildings and structures in Huddersfield